WWE & Company is a fashion, beauty and lifestyle technology company specialising in the development of mobile, cloud-based, O2O commerce enterprise technologies, targeting the mainland Chinese consumers. WWE is a joint venture between The Wharf (Holdings) Limited, Walton Brown Group (a company of The Lane Crawford Joyce Group), and eCargo Holdings Limited (ASX:ECG), initially capitalised at RMB 300 million. WWE & Company was founded and led by Thomson Cheng, President of Walton Brown, and Christopher Lau, CEO and Founder of ECG, as co-CEOs in Hong Kong.

Walton Brown and ECG jointly invested RMB 150 million for an initial 50% equity interest and The Wharf (Holdings) Limited, which operates Harbour City and Times Square in Hong Kong, will co-invest another RMB 150 million for a 50% equity interest through Novel Colour, a wholly owned subsidiary.

WWE is headquartered in Hong Kong and has an office in Shanghai.

References

Online retailers of China
Online clothing retailers